Chalanchi-ye Olya (also Romanized as Chālānchī-ye ‘Olyā; also known as Chālānchī and Halāshī) is a village in Sarab Rural District, in the Central District of Eyvan County, Ilam Province, Iran. At the 2006 census, its population was 429, in 89 families. The village is populated by Kurds.

References 

Populated places in Eyvan County
Kurdish settlements in Ilam Province